Peter Donohoe (born 5 February 1964) is an Irish bobsledder. He competed at the 1998 Winter Olympics and the 2002 Winter Olympics.

References

External links
 

1964 births
Living people
Irish male bobsledders
Olympic bobsledders of Ireland
Bobsledders at the 1998 Winter Olympics
Bobsledders at the 2002 Winter Olympics
Sportspeople from Dublin (city)